The city of Seattle, Washington, United States is served by numerous respected medical institutions. The University of Washington is consistently ranked among the country's dozen leading institutions in medical research, while Group Health Cooperative was one of the pioneers of managed care in the United States. Seattle was a pioneer in the development of modern paramedic services with the establishment of Medic One in 1970.

Seattle Children's Hospital in the Laurelhurst neighborhood is the pediatric referral center for Washington, Alaska, Montana, and Idaho. Harborview Medical Center, the public county hospital located on First Hill, is the only Level I trauma hospital serving those four states. Harborview, Northwest Hospital and Medical Center in Haller Lake, and the University of Washington Medical Center are closely connected, with one physician group (UW Physicians) serving both hospitals. In addition, most Seattle Children's physicians hold faculty appointments at the University of Washington School of Medicine and are employed by the Children's University Medical Group practice plan.

Other hospitals in the community include Swedish Medical Center/Ballard (formerly Ballard General Hospital), Swedish Medical Center/Cherry Hill (formerly Providence Seattle Medical Center), and Swedish Medical Center/First Hill (Swedish's original location), as well as Virginia Mason Hospital on First Hill; the Seattle Division of the Department of Veterans Affairs' Puget Sound Health Care System on Beacon Hill; the Fred Hutchinson Cancer Research Center in Cascade; and Kaiser Permanente's Capitol Hill campus (outpatient only, formerly Group Health Central Hospital and Family Health Center).

First Hill is widely known as "Pill Hill" for its high concentration of hospitals and other medical offices. In addition to being the home of Harborview, Swedish, and Virginia Mason, it is also the former location of Maynard, Seattle General, and Doctors Hospitals (all of which were merged into Swedish) and Cabrini Hospital.

In 1974, a 60 Minutes story on the success of the Medic One paramedic system called Seattle "the best place in the world to have a heart attack." Some accounts report that Puyallup, a city south of Seattle, was the first place west of the Mississippi River to have 911 emergency telephone service.

See also

List of hospitals in Washington (state)

Hospitals in Seattle
Medical facilities